Mark Geoffrey Beevers (born 21 November 1989) is an English professional footballer who currently plays for Perth Glory.

Club career

Sheffield Wednesday
Beevers was born in Barnsley, South Yorkshire. He came through the youth system at South Yorkshire club Sheffield Wednesday and was called up to the senior squad for the FA Cup third round tie with Manchester City on 7 January 2007 after impressing for the reserve team, although he was never brought off the bench. He eventually made his senior debut against Southampton on 31 January 2007 when Wednesday lost 2–1.

Beevers made his first start of the 2007–08 season in a 2–0 defeat to Leicester City on 6 October 2007. Beevers replaced the injured Michael Johnson at half time, and his excellent performance earned him the man of the match award.
Beevers gained another chance in the first team on 6 November 2007 in an away game at West Bromwich Albion, who were flying high in the league and the highest scorers in the league. Beevers lined up alongside Richard Hinds in an inexperienced centre back pairing, however Beevers played with the temperament and quality of a player far beyond his years and helped to earn the Owls a 1–1 draw.

Beevers scored his first senior goal on 6 January 2008 in an FA Cup 3rd round match against Premier League side Derby County which sparked more rumours he would be leaving for a bigger club.
On 17 January 2008 he was placed on standby for England under-19s upcoming game against Croatia on 5 February 2008.

On 28 January 2008, Sheffield Wednesday announced that Beevers had signed an improved contract keeping him at the club until 2012. On 3 March 2008 Beevers was announced as the winner of the third annual Wickes Young Apprentice Trophy at the Football League Awards.

Beevers was voted as the club's Player of the Year at the end of the season by fans. On 31 August 2011, he was loaned to League One side Milton Keynes Dons. The loan ended on 31 December 2011.

Millwall
On 5 October 2012, he was loaned to Championship side Millwall and made his debut the day after against Bolton Wanderers in a 2–1 win. He scored a goal in Millwall's next game, a 2–2 draw with Crystal Palace on 6 October 2012, and on 6 December 2012 it was confirmed that Millwall would confirm the permanent signing of Mark Beevers on 1 January when the transfer window opens. Before the 2014–15 season it was announced that Millwall had rejected a £100,000 bid for Beevers from newly promoted Rotherham United

Bolton Wanderers
On 3 July 2016, he completed a move to Bolton Wanderers on a two-year contract after expressing a desire to leave Millwall and return to the North of England. Bolton finished the season in second place, which was enough to secure an immediate return to the Championship. Beevers, alongside his defensive partner David Wheater, was included in the League One team of the Season. His contract was extended by Bolton at the end of the 2017–18 season after the club exercised a contractual option.

Peterborough United
On 24 May 2019, he completed a move to Peterborough United on a three-year contract after his Bolton contract expired. On 29 April 2021, following an impressive 2020–21 season, Beevers was named in the 2020–21 EFL League One Team of the Season at the league's annual awards ceremony.

On 20 June 2022, Beevers had his contract terminated by mutual consent.

Perth Glory 
On 22 June 2022, it was confirmed that Beevers had signed for A-League club Perth Glory on a two-year deal.

International career
On 23 March 2008, Beevers was called up to the England U19 squad replacing Chelsea's Sam Hutchinson. He went on to make his debut as a second-half substitute in the 3–1 win against Russia on 25 March 2008.

Career statistics

Honours
Sheffield Wednesday
Football League One runner-up: 2011–12

Bolton Wanderers
EFL League One runner-up: 2016–17

Peterborough United
EFL League One runner-up: 2020–21

Individual
Football League Championship Apprentice Award: 2008
Sheffield Wednesday Player of the Year: 2007–08
PFA Team of the Year: 2016–17 League One
EFL League One Team of the Season: 2020–21

References

External links
Mark Beevers player profile at Peterborough United website
Mark Beevers player profile at swfc.co.uk (archived copy: 31 May 2012)

1989 births
Living people
Footballers from Barnsley
English footballers
England youth international footballers
Association football defenders
Sheffield Wednesday F.C. players
Milton Keynes Dons F.C. players
Millwall F.C. players
Bolton Wanderers F.C. players
Peterborough United F.C. players
English Football League players
Perth Glory FC players